Esmail Davarfar (March 1933 – 4 May 2008) was an Iranian actor. He graduated from the faculty of Dramatic Arts at Tehran University. Later he traveled to the United States to pursue his professional career.

Esmail Davarfar remained one of Iran's premier actors throughout his lengthy career. His list of credits includes "Doost-Ali Khān" in Dāyi Jān Napoleon (: My Uncle Napoleon)''.

References 

1933 births
2008 deaths
People from Tehran
Male actors from Tehran
Iranian male film actors
Deaths from cancer in Iran
University of Tehran alumni
Iranian male television actors
20th-century Iranian male actors